The rectification of names is originally a doctrine of feudal Confucian designations and relationships, behaving accordingly to ensure social harmony. Without such accordance society would essentially crumble and "undertakings would not be completed." Mencius extended the doctrine to include questions of political legitimacy.

When Confucius was asked what he would do if he was a governor, he said he would "rectify the names" to make words correspond to reality.

Mohism and Legalism

Because the rectification of names in the Analects of Confucius appears to have been written later, it arguably originates in Mozi (470–391 BC). The scholarship of Herrlee G. Creel argued for its further development through "Legalist" Shen Buhai (400–337 BC) before the Confucian usage for the same reasons. However, professor Zhenbin Sun considers Mozi's rectification consonant with the Confucian usage; Mozi considered it an important factor in the resolution of sociopolitical issues, and not simply legal affairs.

The Mohist and "Legalistic" version of the rectification of names emphasizes the use of hermeneutics to find "objective models" ("fa", 法) for ethics and politics, as well as in practical fields of work, to order or govern society. Mozi advocated language standards appropriate for use by ordinary people. With minimal training, anyone could use these "objective, particularly operational or measurement-like standards" to fix the referents of names, in particular giving identical names to equivalent social relationships and functions so as to apply identical standards of "correct" behavior in analogous situations.

For Guan Zhong (who seemingly originated the Fa concept) as for the Mohists, Fa provided a system of objective, reliable, publicly accessible standards or models that individuals could use for themselves to decide their own actions, in contrast to what Sinologist Chad Hansen terms the "cultivated intuition of self-admiration societies" whereby scholars steeped in old texts maintained a monopoly on moral decision-making. At the same time, Fa could also complement traditional schemes, and Guan Zhong himself uses it alongside the Confucian concept of ceremony (Li, 禮). For the most part, Confucianism does not emphasize Fa, though the concept of norms that people can apply themselves is an older idea, and Han Confucians embraced Fa as an essential element of administration.

Evolving out of the Mohists and school of logicians, reformer Shen Buhai insisted that the ruler must be fully informed on the state of his realm, using Fa as administrative method to sort out informational categories or define functions ("names"). Shen Buhai and later Han Fei (280–233 BC) used this variation on the rectification of names for appointment, matching the words of the official, or his name/title/legal contract, with his performance. Han Fei bases his propositions for lingual uniformity upon the development of this system, proposing that functions could be strictly defined to prevent conflict and corruption, and objective rules (Fa) impervious to divergent interpretation could be established, judged solely by their effectiveness.

By contrast, the Zhuangzi says that "great words are overflowing; small words haggling"(2.2), the true self lacks form(2.3), the mind can spontaneously select (2.4), asks whether language is different from the chirping of birds(2.5), and rejects assertion and denial(2.7), saying "to wear out one's spirit like powers contriving some view... without understanding that it is all the same is called 'three in the morning.

Confucius 
The Analects states that social disorder often stems from failure to call things by their proper names, that is, to perceive, understand, and deal with reality. Confucius' solution to this was the "rectification of names". He gave an explanation to one of his disciples:

The teaching of Confucius consist of five basic relationships in life:
 Ruler to subject
 Parent to child
 Husband to wife
 Elder brother to younger brother
 Friend to friend

In the above relationships, Confucius teaches that righteous, considerate, kind, benevolent, and gentle treatment should be applied by the former to the latter. And that with the application of such practices in day-to-day life, societal problems would be solved and righteous government would be achieved. The carrying out of these relational duties would equate the proper channeling of li and the correct use of zhèngmíng congruent to Confucius' teachings leading to the envisioned path of his doctrine; a moral and efficient society and individuals who have achieved the ascension to superior human beings through the principles of li and jen. The proper operation of oneself ultimately depends on the role of zhèngmíng; essentially a circle of dependency in terms of the practice and application of principles and ways.

In Confucianism, the Rectification of Names means that "things in actual fact should be made to accord with the implications attached to them by names, the prerequisites for correct living and even efficient government being that all classes of society should accord to what they ought to be". Without the rectification of names, different words would have different actions. This essentially means for every action, there is a word that describes that action. The belief is that by following the Rectification of Names, one would be following the correct/right path. The rectification of names also calls for a standard language in which ancient rulers could impose laws that everyone could understand to avoid confusion.

Each person has a social standing and a social name. With their social names comes responsibilities and duties. Ruler, minister, father and son all have social names therefore need to fulfill their required social duties of respect (The rectification of names). For example, in the study of Chinese culture a child only speaks when a parent permits them to speak.
 
Following orders from a person of authority means that you are showing respect, therefore that you are following the Rectification of Names without explicitly acknowledging it. Confucius' belief in the Rectification of Names is still practiced in today's society, for example when a teacher asks a student to address a visitor, that student will follow the instructions.

Xunzi

Xun Zi wrote a chapter on "The Rectification of Names" developing a theme that had been introduced by Confucius saying: "Let the ruler be ruler, the subject subject; let the father be father, and the son son."  Chapter 22, "on the Rectification of Names", claims the ancient sage kings chose names that directly corresponded with actualities, but later generations confused terminology, coined new nomenclature, and thus could no longer distinguish right from wrong.

Xun Zi not only wrote that chapter on the topic of the rectification of names but went as far as to develop/expand the rectification into a system of logic. Xun Zi, who believed that man's inborn tendencies need to be curbed through education and ritual, countered to Mencius's view that man is innately good. He believed that ethical norms had been invented to rectify mankind. Other philosophers and logicians such as Guanzi, Mozi, and Gongsun Long developed their own theories regarding the rectification. Li in itself can be seen as the root of all this propriety and social etiquette discussed in the rectification of names as the cure to society's problems and the solution to a moral and efficient government and society.

Modern applications
The concept of rectification of names is one of the most basic mottoes of Chinese philosophy. It has been applied to a broad range of issues and mainly resides in the field of politics. This basic yet powerful precept has served as a means for the toppling and reforming of dynasties. In today's society, the rectification of names is being used popularly with government decisions.

Backed by strong public demands, Taiwan during Democratic Progressive Party administrations puts effort into reviewing the names of state-owned enterprises and government entities to preserve their unique identity from Chinese influence. For those who still practice the traditional Confucian approach to ethics and social morality, the rectification of names has an impact in the way society is structured. According to Xuezhi Guo, "Rectification of names also implies the promotion and development of an elaborately differentiated system of status based on social obligations".

Notes

Further reading
"A Short History of Chinese Philosophy", Fung Yu-lan, 1948.  Reprint 1976 Ch. 4 pp 41 ff in the paperback edition.
A rose by any other name would smell as sweet
Call a spade a spade
 Nuño Alberto Valenzuela Alonso, "Rectificar los nombres (Xun Zi / Zheng Ming): Un capítulo fundamental en el pensamiento confuciano". Traduccíon estilizada y literal, notas exegéticas y estudio de Nuño Valenzuela Alonso; edición bilingüe chino - español; prólogo de Eric Hutton (University of Utah, USA) y Pedro San Gines (Universidad de Granada, Spain). Published; Madrid. Miraguano Ediciones, 2019, Spain. .

External links
 Daniels, Victor. "CONFUCIUS: A Brief Summary of Central Principles" 23 May 2005. 28 Oct. 2008.
 "The rectification of names" History and literature. Cultural China. 27 Oct. 2008.

Confucianism
Names
Social philosophy